Jaliya Math railway station is a railway station on Ahmedabad–Udaipur Line under the Ahmedabad railway division of Western Railway zone. This is situated beside State Highway 68 at Jaliyano Math, Dahegam in Gandhinagar district of the Indian state of Gujarat.

References

Ahmedabad railway division
Railway stations in Gandhinagar district